County routes in Nassau County, New York are maintained by the Nassau County Department of Public Works. Route numbers were originally posted on unique blue-on-orange pentagonal route markers reflecting the county's official colors; however, all county route signage was removed in the mid-1970s after the Federal Highway Administration enacted new standards for county route markers in 1973. The county legislature refused to allocate funds to replace the signs with new markers conforming to the federal government's Manual on Uniform Traffic Control Devices, leaving the routes unsigned. The route numbers are still used by the county for internal purposes only.



Numbered routes
Route numbers, lengths, and termini are derived from the New York State Department of Transportation's county road listing for Nassau County, unless otherwise noted.

Lettered routes 
This list of county routes (derived from the New York State Department of Transportation's county road listing for Nassau County) have designations that begin with a letter, followed by a number.

Routes C01–C25

Routes C26–C50

Routes C51–C75

Routes C76–C99

Routes D01–D25

Routes D26–D50

Routes D51–D75

Routes D76–D99

Routes E01–E25

Routes E26–E50

Routes E51 and up

See also

County routes in New York
List of county routes in Suffolk County, New York
List of former state routes in New York (101–200)

References

External links

 
Long Island-related lists